Paola Amadei is an Italian diplomat and ambassador of Italy to the Kingdom of Bahrain since January 2020. She entered the diplomatic corps in 1992.

Education and diplomatic career 
She graduated with Political Science with honors from the University of Rome La Sapienza in 1988. She had her master's degree in Advanced European Studies at the College of Europe in Bruges in 1992.

In her first foreign post, she was Deputy Head of Mission and Head of the Commercial Office at the Italian Embassy in Singapore from 1996 to 2000. Amadei was appointed as the Italian ambassador to Oman from 24 September 2012 – 1 March 2016. From June 2018 to January 2020, she was head of Cabinet to the Undersecretary for Foreign Affairs, Minister Plenipotentiary, Ministry of Foreign Affairs and International Cooperation in Rome. She is the Italian ambassador to the Kingdom of Bahrain since January 2020.

Honours
  Officer of the Order of Merit of the Italian Republic – December 27, 2007
 Al Noman Order, First Class, Sultanate of Oman

See also 
 List of ambassadors of Italy
 Ministry of Foreign Affairs (Italy)
 Foreign relations of Italy
 European External Action Service

References

External links 

 

Living people
Ambassadors of Italy to Bahrain
Ambassadors of Italy to Oman
Italian diplomats
Italian women ambassadors
21st-century diplomats
Diplomats from Rome
College of Europe alumni
Sapienza University of Rome alumni
The Fletcher School at Tufts University alumni
1964 births